Lamania is a genus of Southeast Asian araneomorph spiders in the family Pacullidae that was first described by Pekka T. Lehtinen in 1981. Originally placed with the armored spiders, it was moved to the Pacullidae in 2017.

Species
 it contains eight species, found in Malaysia, Thailand, Cambodia, and Indonesia:
Lamania bernhardi (Deeleman-Reinhold, 1980) – Borneo
Lamania bokor Schwendinger & Košulič, 2015 – Cambodia
Lamania gracilis Schwendinger, 1989 – Bali
Lamania inornata (Deeleman-Reinhold, 1980) – Borneo
Lamania kraui (Shear, 1978) – Thailand, Malaysia
Lamania lipsae Dierkens, 2011 – Borneo
Lamania nirmala Lehtinen, 1981 (type) – Borneo
Lamania sheari (Brignoli, 1980) – Indonesia (Sulawesi)

See also
 List of Pacullidae species

References

Araneomorphae genera
Pacullidae
Spiders of Asia
Taxa named by Pekka T. Lehtinen